Philodoria nigrella is a moth of the family Gracillariidae. It was first described by Lord Walsingham in 1907. It is endemic to the island of Hawaii.

The larvae probably mine the leaves of their host plant like other members of the Philodoria genus.

References

External links
 
 

Philodoria
Endemic moths of Hawaii
Taxa named by Thomas de Grey, 6th Baron Walsingham
Moths described in 1907